Uchima (written: 内間) is an Okinawan surname. Notable people with the surname include:

, Japanese cyclist
, Japanese footballer

Okinawan surnames